Vartiainen is a Finnish surname. Notable people with the surname include:

Jenni Vartiainen (born 1983), Finnish pop singer
Juhana Vartiainen (born 1958), Finnish politician
Tuomas Vartiainen (born 1996), Finnish ice hockey player
Varre Vartiainen (born 1974), Finnish guitarist

Finnish-language surnames